Bersuit is a compilation album by the Argentine Rock band Bersuit Vergarabat, released in 2006. The album features also a live DVD from the tour La Argentinidad al Palo, that features mainly songs from the album of the same name.  This live concert was recorded in Mendoza, Argentina.

Track listing

CD
"Se Viene" (Cordera, Verenzuela) – 3:25 (from Libertinaje)
"Yo Tomo" (Roghi, Verenzuela, Cordera, Cépedes, Subirá, Martín) – 3:32 (from Libertinaje)
"La Soledad" (Cordera, Suárez, Sbarbatti) – 4:23 (from La Argentinidad al Palo)
"Sr. Cobranza" (De la Vega) – 4:19 (from Libertinaje)
"La Bolsa" (Subirá, Cordera, Martín, Céspedes, Righi, Verenzuela) – 3:32 (from Hijos del Culo)
"El Viejo De Arriba" (Subirá) – 3:26 (from Hijos del Culo)
"Esperando El Impacto" (Righi) – 3:36 (from Testosterona)
"La Argentinidad Al Palo" (Cordera, Righi, Subirá, Céspedes, Martín) – 5:29 (from La Argentinidad al Palo)
"Desconexión Sideral" (Subirá) – 4:51 (from Hijos del Culo)
"C.S.M." (Subirá, Céspedes) – 2:40 (from Libertinaje)
"Perro Amor Explota" (Cordera, Martín) – 4:28 (from De la Cabeza)
"Mi Caramelo" (Cordera) – 3:29 (from Don Leopardo)
"Murguita Del Sur" (Cordera) – 5:03 (from Libertinaje)
"El Tiempo No Para" (Cazuza-Brandao. Translation: Cordera, Martín) – 5:21 (from Y Punto)
"Un Pacto" (Cordera) – 4:55 (from De la Cabeza)

DVD
"La Soledad" – 4:44
"El Baile De La Gambeta" – 4:07
"Va Por Chapultepec" – 4:05
"Porno Star" – 3:55
"Canción De Juan" – 6:18
"No Seas Parca" – 4:33
"Convalescencia En Valencia" – 5:15
"Ojo Por Ojojo" – 5:32
"Otra Sudestada" – 6:31
"Ades Tiempo" – 4:14
"Mariscal Tito" – 5:02
"Fisurar" – 4:09
"Coger No Es Amor" – 5:48
"Murga De La Limousine" – 2:56
Featuring Los Auténticos Decadentes
"La Argentinidad Al Palo" – 5:29
Featuring Andres Calamaro
"El Viento Trae Una Copla" – 8:21
"Al Olor Del Hogar" – 3:17
"Negra Murguera" – 5:50
"Shit Shit Money Money" – 5:11

Bersuit Vergarabat albums
2006 compilation albums
2006 video albums
Live video albums
2006 live albums